The 20501 / 20502 Agartala - Anand Vihar Terminal Tejas Rajdhani Express is a semi-high-speed Fully AC Train belonging to the Northeast Frontier Railway zone, and  runs between Agartala and Anand Vihar Terminal in New Delhi, India. It is currently being operated as train numbers  20501/20502  on a weekly basis.

It became the 1st Rajdhani express to be rolled out with Tejas Express livery Sleeper LHB coach operated from 15 February 2021.

Speed and service details
The 20501 Agartala–Anand Vihar Terminal Tejas Rajdhani Express has an average speed of 61 km/h and covers 2427 km in 40 hrs 5 mins.

The 20502 Anand Vihar Terminal–Agartala Tejas Rajdhani Express has an average speed of 58 km/h and covers 2427 km in 41 hrs 30 mins.

Route and halts 
TRIPURA
 (Starts) 

ASSAM
New Karimganj Junction

WEST BENGAL

BIHAR

UTTAR PRADESH
Pt. Deen Dayal Upadhyay Junction

DELHI
 (Ends)

Coach composition

The train has standard Tejas Express livery LHB coach of 18 coaches, capable of achieving a maximum speed of 130 km/hr. The coach configuration is:

 1 First AC classes
 3 AC II Tiers
 11 AC III Tiers
 1 Pantry car
 2 End-on Generator Car
 1 Luggage Van

Locomotive

Running 
Train No. 20501 Agartala to Anand Vihar Terminal Tejas Rajdhani Express runs on Monday from Agartala and reaches Anand Vihar Terminal on Wednesday. Train No. 20502 Anand Vihar Terminal to Agartala Tejas Rajdhani Express runs on Wednesday from Anand Vihar Terminal and reaches Agartala on Friday.

See also 

 Agartala railway station
 Anand Vihar Terminal railway station
Tripura Sundari Express
Agartala–SMVT Bengaluru Humsafar Express
Sealdah–Agartala Kanchenjunga Express
Deoghar–Agartala Weekly Express
 Howrah Rajdhani Express

Notes

References

External links 

 20501/Agartala - Anand Vihar Terminal Rajdhani Express
 20502/Anand Vihar Terminal - Agartala Rajdhani Express

https://www.youtube.com/watch?v=THGHwYqHXmY

Transport in Agartala
Transport in Delhi
Rajdhani Express trains
Rail transport in Tripura
Rail transport in Assam
Rail transport in West Bengal
Rail transport in Jharkhand
Rail transport in Bihar
Rail transport in Uttar Pradesh
Rail transport in Delhi